Yo, Judío (Me, I'm a Jew) is a 1934 essay about antisemitism by the Argentine writer Jorge Luis Borges.

About
In 1934, Argentine ultra-nationalists affiliated with the magazine Crisol, sympathetic to Adolf Hitler and the Nazi Party, asserted Borges was secretly Jewish, and by implication, not truly Argentine. Borges responded by writing the essay, the title of which is a reference to the old phrase "Yo, Argentino" ("Me, I'm Argentine") that was uttered by potential victims during pogroms against Argentine Jews, to signify one was not Jewish. In the essay, Borges declares he would be proud to be a Jew, and remarks that any pure Castilian is likely to come from ancient Jewish descent, from a millennium ago.

In the essay, Borges details his own efforts, strenuous but ultimately futile, to document possible Jewish ancestors in his own family's genealogy:

Charlie Chaplin was not Jewish, despite being named as Jewish in the essay. Sarah Rinder, writing to Mosaic Magazine, suggests that Borges expresses a "liking especially for those Jews who have transcended, or even shed, their Jewish identities."

See also
Antisemitism in Argentina
Conversos
History of the Jews in Argentina

References

External links
Borges y el judaísmo, Casa de América
Yo, judío, New York University

1934 essays
Anti-racism
Antisemitism in Argentina
Conversos
Jewish Argentine history
Opposition to antisemitism
Philosemitism
Racial antisemitism
Zionism
Works about antisemitism
Works by Jorge Luis Borges